Bala Shad Deh (also Romanized as Bālā Shād Deh; also known as Bālā Shādeh and Shādeh) is a village in Lafmejan Rural District, in the Central District of Lahijan County, Gilan Province, Iran. At the 2006 census, its population was 291, in 93 families.

References 

Populated places in Lahijan County